Wani is a 3rd largest city  in Yavatmal district in the Indian state of Maharashtra.

Wani is located in eastern part of Yavatmal district and borders Chandrapur district. Despite being a taluka, Wani is important commercial hub for nearby area due to its strong market and its crucial location. Yavatmal city is 110 kmy from Wani and Chandrapur is only 55 km. Nagpur is 130 km from Wani and Wardha is 110 km by road connectivity.

History
Wani has age old rock cut temples, including the Rangnath Swami Mandir, Kala Ram Mandir and Narsimha Mandir present in the southern part of the city.
In past, Wani was known as 'Wun'. Wani was a district headquarters in Berar Province during British Raj. Later on, Wani became a taluka with Yavatmal as district head.

Demographics
As of the 2011 census of India, Wani had a population of 58,840 excluding the outer part of the city. Villages like Ganeshpur, Chikhalgaon, Waghdara, Lalguda are in city boundaries but the population is not included in the city population. The population can reach one lakh if we include these villages.  Males constituted 51% of the population and females 49%. Wani had an average literacy rate of 74%, higher than the national average of 59.5%: male literacy was 80%, and female literacy was 68%. In 2011 in Wani, 13% of the population was under 6 years of age.

Geography
Summer in Wani is generally very hot with temperature ranges in mid 40s, mainly due to coal mines. The city has its very own river, River Nirguada which further merges with River Wardha.

Coal Mining and Economy
Western Coalfields Ltd., A subsidiary of Coal India Ltd. has a coal mining area - Wani North Area in the surroundings of Wani city. There are coal mines like Ukni, Pimpalgaon, Junad, Kolarpimpri, Rajur, Kumbarkhani, Ghonsa, Neeljai, Naigaon and some new upcoming mining projects near the city.

The economy of the town is mostly driven by agriculture and mining businesses in the surrounding area. Mining has been a boon for the development of rural population in the area, which provided them employment and boosted the economy. many cotton ginning and pressing units also working. cottonseed oil milling units also started in recent years. because of lime stone availability wall putty manufacturing units are working in rural areas. in MIDC metal fabrication unit, cement precast and pipe making units, dall mill (pulse processing factory) etc are working

The town received the name "Black Diamond City" due to the huge coal deposits and many coal mines in the adjacent area.

Limestone is also quarried in the area.

The principal crops are cotton and soybeans.

Education

Schools 
Wani Public School and Junior College (WPSJC)
Black Diamond International Pre School, Wani
Sushganga Public School CBSE
KIDZ International School
Black Diamond International School, Choriya Layout, Wani
Shikshan Prasarak Mandal High School & Junior College
Vivekanand Vidyalaya
Adarsh High School
Lions English Medium High School & Junior College
Swarnleela International School
Janata High School 
Macaroon Students Academy
Smt. Nusabai Chopane Vidyalaya
Z.P.High School
Sunrise Convent School
Santaji English Medium School
Dreamz Play School
Rajshri Shahu Maharaj Hindi Vidyalaya
Hello Kids International (Play School)
Scholars International School (SISMaregaon)
Shree Vishwakarma Vocational Training Center, Wani
Shanti Juniors, Chhoriya Layout
Dyan Prabodhini School

Colleges 
Lokmanya Tilak Mahavidyalaya, Wani
Sushganga Polytechnic College, Naigaon
Balaji Polytechnic College, Sawarla
Shikshan Prasarak Mandal Institute of Pharmacy, Wani
Shri. Jagannath Maharaj College, Wani
Industrial Training Institute(ITI), Wani
SCSMSS-Private Industrial Training Center, Wani.(ITI Wani)
SCSMSS Institute of Pharmacy (IOPM)

Religious Places

Temples 

 Shri Ranganatha Swami Mandir
 Shri Jaitai Mata Mandir
 Shri Jod-Mahadev Mandir
 Shri Jain Sthanak
 Shri Sambhavnath Jain Mandir
 Shri Kalaram Mandir
 Shri Sai mandir
 Shri Jagannath Maharaj Mandir
 Shri Sai Darbar
 Hanuman Mandir
 Mahakali Mata Mandir
 Santdham
 Ganpati Mandir
 Shiv Mandir
 Shani Mandir
 Shri Ram Mandir
 Vithhal Mandir
 Sant Gadge Baba Mandir
 Jata Shankar Mandir
 Gajanan Maharaj Mandir
 Datta Mandir
 Jagdamba Mandir
 Mahadev Mandir , Sutapura [Natraj chowk]
 Mahakali Mata Mandir

Mosques 
 Jama Masjid
 Masjid E Hayat
 Nagina Masjid
 Madina Masjid
 Aqsa Masjid
 Dargah Hazrat Sayyad Murad Ali Shah Baba (R.A)
 Dargah Khawaja Mohammad Hayat(R.A) Mominpura

Gurudwara 
 Sindhi Gurudwara

Churches 
 Free Methodist Church
 New Methodist Church

Transport

Road

Highways

Wani Bus Station
Wani Bus Station works under Maharashtra State Road Transport Corporation MSRTC.

It includes 12 Platforms,  Canteen, Temple, Garden, Parking  Lot, Bus Depo and Diesel Pump.

 Shivshahi Express
 Wani-Akola (via Yavatmal)
 Wani-Nagpur (via Warora)
 Ordinary Express
Wani is connected with major cities like Yavatmal, Nagpur, Pune, Aurangabad, Adilabad, Nanded, Akola, Amravati, Chandrapur, Pusad, Washim, Gadchiroli, Darwha, Digras, Ner by MSRTC buses.

 Local Express
Local buses are connected to nearby towns such as Maregaon, Pandharkawda, Korpana and several villages.

Local Transport 
Auto rickshaws are the only public transport in the city.

Railway
Wani is a regular type railway station, under Nagpur division of Central Railway.

It has one platform, with single electrified line. The Railway Station is mostly busy with coal transportation.

Wani is directly connected with Adilabad, Mumbai, Nagpur, Patna, Nanded, among many other cities.

Transport
Trains heavily transport coal and other products are also loaded.

Population

Town/Cities

Villages 

ref:www.census2011.co.in

Languages 
Marathi language is the dominant language, among few other languages including Banjari(Gor boli),Hindi, Sindhi, Marwadi, Punjabi,telugu,urdu etc.

References

Cities and towns in Yavatmal district
Talukas in Maharashtra